Vignes may refer to one of these places:
 France
Vignes, Pyrénées-Atlantiques, a commune in the French region of Aquitaine
Vignes, Yonne, a commune in the French region of Bourgogne
Vignes-la-Côte, a commune in the French region of Champagne-Ardenne

 United States
Vignes, Wisconsin, an unincorporated community in Door County

or to these people:
 Alberto Juan Vignes, Argentine Minister of Foreign Affairs, 1973-1975
 Christian Vignes, French rugby player
 Hans des Vignes, Trinidadian radio broadcaster
 Jean-Louis Vignes, early California vintner
 Sashina Vignes, French badminton player